The VA-111 Shkval (from , squall) torpedo and its descendants are supercavitating torpedoes originally developed by the Soviet Union. They are capable of speeds in excess of 200 knots (370 km/h or 230 miles/h).

Design and capabilities 
Design began in the 1960s when the NII-24 research institute was ordered to produce a new weapon capable of engaging nuclear submarines. The merger of the institute and GSKB-47 created the Research Institute of Applied Hydromechanics, who continued with the design and production of the Shkval.

Previously operational as early as 1977, the torpedo was announced as being deployed in the 1990s. The Shkval is intended as a countermeasure against torpedoes launched by undetected enemy submarines.

A solid-fuel rocket accelerates it to cavitation speed, with a combined-cycle gas turbine in the nose creating the required gas bubble. Published information about this type of hydro-ramjet shows a dedicated steam circuit for the supercavitation generating head.

The high speed is made possible by supercavitation, whereby a gas bubble surrounding the torpedo is created by outward deflection of water by its specially-shaped nose cone and the expansion of gases from its engine and the gas generator in the nose. This minimizes water contact with the torpedo, significantly reducing drag.

Early designs may have relied solely on an inertial guidance system. The initial design was intended for nuclear warhead delivery. Later designs reportedly include terminal guidance and conventional warheads.

The torpedo steers using four fins that skim the inner surface of the supercavitation gas bubble. To change direction, the fin(s) on the inside of the desired turn are extended, and the opposing fins are retracted.

In 2016, KTRV was upgrading Shkval.

Manufacture 
The torpedo is manufactured in Kyrgyzstan by a state-owned factory. In 2012 the Russian government asked for a 75% ownership of the factory in exchange for writing off massive Kyrgyz debt to Russia.

Espionage 
In 2000, former U.S. Naval intelligence officer and an alleged Defense Intelligence Agency (DIA) spy Edmond Pope (Captain, USN, retired) was held, tried, and convicted in Russia of espionage related to information he obtained about the Shkval weapon system. Russian President Vladimir Putin pardoned Pope in December 2000 on humanitarian grounds because he had bone cancer.

Operators

 
Russian Navy

  (possibly)
Islamic Republic of Iran Navy (possibly)
 (possibly)
Vietnam People's Navy (possibly equipped with Kilo-class submarines, it is suspected that Vietnam owns this type of torpedo in its inventory due to a picture showing a part of VA-111 and Vietnamese labels)

Variants 
There are at least three variants:
 VA-111 Shkval – Original variant; GOLIS autonomous inertial guidance.
 "Shkval 2" – Current variant; believed to have additional guidance systems, possibly via the use of vectored thrust, and with a much longer range.
 A less capable version currently being exported to foreign naval forces. The export version is referred to as "Shkval-E".
 Iran claimed it has created a version named Hoot.

All current versions are believed to be fitted only with conventional explosive warheads, although the original design used a nuclear warhead.

Specifications 
 Length: 
 Diameter: 
 Weight: 
 Warhead weight: 
 Speed
 Launch speed: 
 Maximum speed:  or greater
 Range: Around  (new version). Older versions only

References

Sources

External links 

 FAS page on the VA-111 Shkval underwater rocket 
 
 

Dagdizel Plant products
Supercavitating torpedoes
Torpedoes of Russia
Torpedoes of the Soviet Union
Weapons and ammunition introduced in 1977